Team Shachi (stylized as TEAM SHACHI), formerly , is a Japanese female idol group consisting of four girls from the city of Nagoya.

Overview 
Team Syachihoko is a sister group of two other girl groups managed by the Stardust Promotion talent agency, Momoiro Clover Z and Shiritsu Ebisu Chugaku and, having been formed in 2011, is the "youngest sister" of the three.

The group was created of six girls from Aichi Prefecture. As of 2012, all members lived in Nagoya, the capital of the prefecture, and were junior high school students. In April 2013, five of them started high school, and Haruna Sakamoto is the only one who is still in junior high.

From April 5, 2013, Team Syachihoko has its own regular TV show, broadcast on Nagoya TV.

History 
Team Syachihoko was formed in 2011 by 3B Junior, the third section of Stardust Promotion. In April 2012, the group debuted live on the streets of Nagoya (on the Nishinomaru Square), and continued with more events in the Nagoya area.

In the summer of 2012, Team Syachihoko participated in a nationwide concert series titled "HMV Idol Gakuen presents Nihon Jyūdan Idol Ranbu 2012", appearing at two concerts: on August 10 in Nagoya and on August 23 in Tokyo. During the August 10 performance, the group announced that it would soon release its first major-label single, on October 31 on the Warner Music Japan record label. The single was labeled the "Nagoya major-debut single" and was supported by a concert tour across the city of Nagoya. On September 2, at the first concert of the tour, the group appeared in stage costumes looking like bowling uniforms and unveiled the title song of the upcoming single, titled "The Stardust Bowling". The song, written and composed by Takashi Asano, who had already authored two indie songs for the band, told a story of a bowling ball that, after being thrown, overcame various difficulties on its way along the lane and finished with a strike. The Japanese edition of Rolling Stone called the song "cute and humorous", with a "dramatic melody", "brilliantly following the style of Momoiro Clover and Shiritsu Ebisu Chugaku". The single reached 17th place in the weekly Oricon charts.

During the Nagoya tour, which took place from September 2 to November 4, the girls faced various challenges presented by the band's manager, such as "Yuzu and Yuzuki don't eat sweets in the dressing room while on tour", "1000 sumultaneous viewers on the Ustream broadcast", etc. Each won challenge equalled one "crown" (point). The group had to collect 10 crowns to be granted a first solo concert and a nationwide major-label debut. The band won 13 crowns and received the right to hold a solo concert on December 30 at Nagoya's Club Quattro, but the release of the promised single was delayed for three months with the reason stated by Team Syachihoko's manager Hasegawa to be that the 13 crowns were more than the target number of 10. All the 500 tickets for the concert were sold out. The performance was released as the group's first live DVD on April 24, 2013.

On December 24, 2012, and on April 7, 2013, Team Syachihoko released two limitedly distributed singles, sold at the band's live events. The first single was titled "Otome Juken Sensō" ("Girls' Entrance Exam War") and was issued in a total of 7,777 serial-numbered copies. By February 13, it had been sold out. The follow-up, called "Otome Juken Sensō: Another War", was printed in 8,888 copies.

The group released its next single on June 19, 2013. It was titled "Shuto Iten Keikaku" ("Plan for the Relocation of the Capital") and was marketed as their .

On October 30, 2013, the group's fifth single "Ai no Chikyūsai" ("Charity Earth Festival") was released.

On November 18, 2015, it was announced that Yuzu Ando would go on temporary hiatus due to being diagnosed with vertigo. By February 10, 2016, the status of Ando's hiatus changed from temporary to indefinite due to her ongoing health issues. On September 29, 2016, Yuzu Ando graduated from the group and Team Syachihoko continued activities as a five-person idol group.

On August 3, 2018, Team Syachihoko announced on LINE LIVE that Chiyuri Itō would perform her final live concert with the group on October 22 and graduate. On October 22, 2018, the group announced its renaming to Team Shachi (stylized as TEAM SHACHI) effective 23 October.

Members 

* All color values are approximate.

Former members

Timeline

Discography

Studio albums

Compilation albums

Extended plays

Singles

As lead artists

As featured artists

Video albums

Live albums

Variety releases

Notes

References

External links 
  
 
 Team Syachihoko's channel on Ustream

Japanese girl groups
Japanese idol groups
Japanese pop music groups
Musical groups established in 2011
2011 establishments in Japan
Child musical groups
Warner Music Japan artists

Stardust Promotion artists
Musical groups from Aichi Prefecture